Mannaseh Mwanza (born 12 December 1978) is a retired Zambian football defender. He was a squad member at the 2000 African Cup of Nations.

References

1978 births
Living people
Zambian footballers
Zambia international footballers
Nkana F.C. players
Power Dynamos F.C. players
Highlanders F.C. players
Association football defenders
Zambian expatriate footballers
Expatriate footballers in Zimbabwe
Zambian expatriate sportspeople in Zimbabwe
2000 African Cup of Nations players